Balmonte is one of nine parishes (administrative divisions) in Castropol, a municipality within the province and autonomous community of Asturias, in northern Spain. 

The population is 260 (INE 2005).

References

Parishes in Castropol